Hawkwood is a rural locality in the North Burnett Region, Queensland, Australia. In the  Hawkwood had a population of 27 people.

Geography 
Auburn River National Park is in the north-east of the locality extending into neighbouring Dykehead. Other protected areas in the locality are Delembra State Forest in the north-east of the locality and Koko State Forest in the south which extends into neighbouring Kragra.

Excluding the protected areas, the predominant land use is grazing on native vegetation.

Hawkwood has the following mountains:
Hawkwood Road is the major route through the locality, entering from the north-west (Dykehead) and exiting to the south-west (Auburn).

History 
In the  Hawkwood had a population of 27 people.

Economy 
There are a number of homesteads in the locality, including:

 Hawkwood
 Hillgrove
 Well Station

Transport 
Hawkwood Airstrip is near the Hawkwood homestead.

References 

North Burnett Region
Localities in Queensland